Lee Andrew Tuck (born 30 June 1988) is a professional footballer who plays as a attacking midfielder for Malaysia Super League club Kedah Darul Aman and the Malaysian national team. Since leaving the English non-league in 2010, Tuck has spent most of his professional career in South East Asia, playing in the top-flight leagues of Thailand, Bangladesh and Malaysia. He obtained Malaysian citizenship through naturalisation.

Club career

England
Tuck started his career with boyhood club Halifax Town in 2008. He also had spells with Bradford (Park Avenue) and Guiseley.

Thailand and Bangladesh
Tuck arrived in Thailand in 2010 after leaving Farsley Celtic, after spells also with taking up a friend's invitation to play for Nakhon Pathom FC. After his contract with Nakhon Pathom ended on 31 October 2010, Tuck signed a contract with Thai second division club Customs United in 2011.

Tuck played for Bangkok FC between 2011 and 2013 when he scored 51 goals in 77 league games and they narrowly missed out on promotion, finishing fourth in Tuck's last season with the club.

Tuck joined Air Force Central from Bangkok FC in 2014 and was loaned to Nakhon Ratchasima. He later moved to Nakhon Ratchasima on a permanent deal in 2015. After spending six years in Thai football, he joined Bangladeshi side Abahani Limited Dhaka, where he won the 2016 Bangladesh Football Premier League.

Negeri Sembilan
In January 2017, Tuck signed a one-year deal with Malaysia Premier League side Negeri Sembilan FC. On 20 January 2017, Tuck made his league debut in a 3–0 win over Sabah FC as first starter. His first league goal came in from a 2–1 home win against MISC-MIFA on 28 February 2017. On 11 March 2017, Tuck scored a hat-trick in 2017 Malaysia FA Cup third round match against Penang FC helping his side advance to the next round. Due his leadership qualities, he was appointed as the vice-captain of Negeri Sembilan.

Terengganu
On 16 November 2017, Tuck signed a contract with Terengganu FC after the club had been promoted to the tier 1 Malaysian league. He scored a total of 23 league goals throughout his career with the club.

Sri Pahang
On 26 November 2020, Tuck signed a contract with Sri Pahang FC.

Loan return to Terengganu
On May 2021, Tuck made a comeback to Terengganu FC on a six-month loan deal until the end of the 2021 season. He only featured in three league matches, scoring just one goal and an assist for the club, before returning to his parent club.

International career
In November 2022, Tuck earned his first call-up to the Malaysian squad for their training camp ahead of the 2022 AFF Championship. On 9 December 2022, he made his first appearance in a friendly match against Cambodia and scored his first goal in the same match. Lee's first goal in his debut wasn't enough for him as he scored the third goal against Maldives on 14 December 2022.

International goals

Career statistics

Honours
Abahani Limited Dhaka
Bangladesh Football Premier League: 2015–16
Bangladesh Federation Cup: 2016

Terengganu
Sheikh Kamal International Club Cup: 2019

Individual
Thailand Division 1 League Golden Boot: 2012
Sheikh Kamal International Club Cup Top Scorer: 2019

References

External links

Lee Tuck at Goal.com

1988 births
Living people
Footballers from Halifax, West Yorkshire
Malaysian footballers
Malaysia international footballers
English footballers
English emigrants to Malaysia
Malaysian people of English descent
Halifax Town A.F.C. players
Farsley Celtic A.F.C. players
Lee Tuck
Lee Tuck
Lee Tuck
Abahani Limited (Dhaka) players
Negeri Sembilan FA players
Lee Tuck
English expatriate footballers
Expatriate footballers in Thailand
English expatriate sportspeople in Thailand
Association football midfielders
Bradford (Park Avenue) A.F.C. players
Guiseley A.F.C. players
Kedah Darul Aman F.C. players